Furuvik Zoo is an amusement park and zoo in Furuvik, Sweden.

Location 
The zoo is located in Furuvik, near Gävle, Sweden.

History 

Furuviksparken was founded in 1900 by Oscar Jakobsson and officially opened by count Olle Cronstedt. In 1938 the zoo was bought by Gösta Nygren, who managed the zoo for 45 years. Nygren established a youth circus, Furuviksbarnen (the children of Furuvik), which became the main attraction not only in the park but also on travelling tours. Nyhren also introduced live concerts with famous artists, like Louis Armstrong, Jussi Björling and Sammy Davis.

Gävle Municipality took over the park 1983, again sold to Tom Widorson in 2004, and in 2010 sold to the present owner, Parks & Resorts Scandinavia AB.

Chimpanzees

The zoo attracted a degree of international attention when it was reported in March 2009 that a chimpanzee residing there had planned attacks on visitors. Santino planned attacks by taking stones from the protective moat and placing them only on the side facing the visitors on the island where he lived. Later, when the visitors arrived, he would throw the stones across the moat at them.

This shows that the cognitive ability for forward planning is not uniquely human.

After five chimpanzees' escape from the zoo in December 2022, three were shot dead - the 3-year-old Torsten, Linda and Santino -, one was wounded, and one returned to the zoo. Later, a fourth was shot dead.

External links

References
Much of the content of this article comes from the equivalent Swedish-language Wikipedia article. Retrieved on 6 December 2014. Some of the following references are cited by that Swedish-language article:

Zoos in Sweden
Tourist attractions in Gävleborg County
Amusement parks in Sweden